

The Ringwood - Belgrave Rail Trail is a shared use path for cyclists and pedestrians, which follows the Belgrave railway line from the Mullum Mullum Creek Trail in Ringwood to Belgrave railway station in Belgrave, in the outer eastern suburbs of Melbourne, Victoria, Australia.

This trail is known to be a convenient and popular trail as it connects with various other trails in the area as well as being directly serviced by eight railway stations on the Belgrave railway line along its 19.2 km route.

An interactive map of the trail as well as others in the Melbourne area is available from the 'External Links' section in this article.

Following the trail 
Despite the trail being marked in several publications and on cycle route websites, the trail has minimal directional signage. The following sections describe the route of the trail:

Ringwood - Bayswater 
Starting in Ringwood and ending in Belgrave, the trail begins as a turn-off from the Mullum Mullum Creek Trail near the Ringwood Bypass underpass in Ringwood, before the trail travels on a short 250 m section of local streets before a short path goes to the Maroondah Highway / Ringwood Bypass / Mount Dandenong Road intersection. The trail resumes at the south-east corner of this intersection before travelling through Ringwood Lake and crossing the Lilydale railway line before travelling through Bedford Reserve on a sealed access road.

The trail now follows Bedford Road east for 170 m, which can be traversed either on-road or via the roadside footpaths and the pedestrian traffic lights outside Ringwood Secondary College. The trail takes a right and runs south down Lena Grove for 360 m before the off-road shared path resumes at the cul-de-sac. The trail now follows the Belgrave railway line on the eastern side until Heathmont railway station, before the trail swaps to the western side of the railway at Canterbury Road. The trail now goes downhill to H.E. Parker reserve in Heathmont. Using the reserve access road heading south, a left turn at the footbridge over the Dandenong Creek takes you to the Dandenong Creek Trail. At this point, the Ringwood - Belgrave Rail Trail and the Dandenong Creek Trail share the same path for 835 m east before the trails branch off from each other. A right turn immediately after the tunnel under the railway then takes you south along the eastern side of the railway line towards Mountain Highway and Bayswater railway station.

Bayswater - Upper Ferntree Gully 
Around Bayswater railway station, the trail runs past the bus stops and the station car park, which usually creates a congested environment with many pedestrian and vehicular movements, so care needs to be taken when traversing this section.  The trail then continues on the western side of the railway until Bayswater Road, where the trail then switches back to the eastern side. The trail then travels uninterrupted to Boronia railway station where the user has to cautiously navigate through the Boronia Junction Shopping Centre car park to reach the Boronia Road / Dorset road intersection. The trail resumes on the south-east corner of the intersection, where it once again follows the railway on the eastern side. The turn-off for the Blind Creek Trail is encountered halfway between Boronia and Ferntree Gully. Once reaching Ferntree Gully railway station, the trail travels through the station car park to the level crossing, where the trail resumes. After crossing at the Alpine Street / Station Street / The Avenue intersection, the trail continues south on the western side of the railway, with a scenic footbridge over Forest Road before the trail arrives at pedestrian traffic lights at Burwood Highway in Upper Ferntree Gully. A short 400 m shared use path takes the user to the entrance to Upper Ferntree Gully railway station while crossing at the traffic lights takes you further along the trail.

Upper Ferntree Gully - Belgrave 
The trail now travels south on a shared use path alongside Forest Oak Drive before arriving at the turn-off for the Ferny Creek Trail. A left turn then takes you east through the area immediately south of Upper Ferntree Gully. Most of this section runs along shared-use paths alongside local streets. Upon reaching the railway bridge over Burwood Highway, the trail runs east alongside native trees and shrubs between the northern side of the railway and the southern side of Burwood Highway. This takes the user to Upwey and Upwey railway station. Staying on the northern side of the railway, the trail continues to run alongside Burwood Highway until Glenfern Road, where the trail leaves the highway and follows the railway once again until arriving at the end of Campbell street in Tecoma. A 130 m trip along Campbell Street and a right turn down McNicol Road leads to an immediate right turn to Tecoma railway station while an immediate left turn is where the trail continues. A short trip down this final section of shared use path leads to the back of the Belgrave strip shops where a short 220 m on-road trip down Blacksmiths Way east leads to the entrance to Belgrave railway station, where the trail finishes.

Connections 
Travelling downhill, from south to north, the Ferny Creek Trail is encountered first, then the Blind Creek Trail, then the Dandenong Creek Trail and finally the upper Mullum Mullum Creek Trail.

The start of the Birds Land Reserve to Lysterfield Park Trail starts near the Belgrave Rail Trail. Leave the trail at Tecoma railway station and head south down McNicol Road, arriving at the reserve 2.5 km later. Alternatively leave from Belgrave railway station and head south, down the Belgrave-Hallam Road. Turn right (west) at Kaola Street 600 m later cross the very small reserve to Apsley Rd. Continue down Apsley Rd and turn left at McNicol Road, cross the bridge and arrive at Birds Land reserve, 3 km all up.

The south end of the Birds Land Reserve to Lysterfield Park Trail starts at the very south end of Lysterfield Park, just 4.5 km by quiet roads from the Hallam Bypass Trail. Leave the Hallam Bypass Trail using the freeway underpass 400 m west of Ernst Wanke Road. Follow the shared path, than travel along Drysdale Road and Heathdale Road. At the small roundabout turn left (north) up Glenwood Road. Cross Belgrave-Hallam Road and continue north up Jacques Road. Turn left (west) at Heatherton Road and then right (north) up Reservoir Road.

References 

Bike rides around Melbourne 3rd edition, 2009, Julia Blunden, Open Spaces Publishing,

External links 
 An interactive map of the trail as well as others in the Melbourne area is available here: Walking and Cycling in Melbourne
Maroondah BUG - Ringwood Lake area

Bike paths in Melbourne
Rail trails in Victoria (Australia)